"Flash Delirium" is a song released by the American psychedelic rock band MGMT on their second album Congratulations. It was the first single to be released from the album and was originally referred to as a "taster" before the band abandoned their original plan to not release any singles from Congratulations in order to solidify its existence as a singular body of work. A free digital download of the song was given away on the band's official website. "Flash Delirium" was made available as a digital download from iTunes on March 24, 2010.

On this song Andrew Vanwyngarden expresses his feelings towards social networking and directly references to a popular site with the line "stab your Facebook." He expands on this in an interview with online magazine Coup De Main stating his disgust at the distraction it causes from real life. "It's just this weird little world which is fueled by vanity and looking at pictures of yourself."

Reception
Many critics praised "Flash Delirium" for its adventurism and distinct clash of styles. Rolling Stone magazine said it "ultimately keeps building until it explodes into a rapturous harmony, breaking into full-out thrash in its waning seconds." Pitchfork said the song "features flutes, horns, and about seven different sections that reference doo-wop, old school rock'n'roll, electro balladry, Ariel Pink-style lo-fi, wall-of-Spector pop, and the Beatles at their most high. All in four minutes and sixteen seconds!" "Flash Delirium" was also described as a "psychedelic trip."

Music video
The video for "Flash Delirium," directed by Andreas Nilsson, "lends a visual clue into the maelstrom and chaos of modern times." It premiered on MGMT's website on Tuesday, March 30, 2010. It shows the two lead members of the band (Andrew VanWyngarden and Ben Goldwasser) at a welcome-home party. Ben touches a bandage at his neck a few times, with Andrew pulling his arm away from it each time. However, at the party, Ben removes the bandage to reveal a hole in his throat. Out of this hole is pulled an eel, which is then shoved into a machine and presumably destroyed, though the eel is shown wiggling in the hole in a few brief shots. The house trembles and the guests of the party dance as the machine emits lights, violently shaking. The video ends with a picture from outside the house showing something exploding inside and a guttural sound as the camera moves. In the very beginning of the music video, there is a banner outside the car that reads, "Sue the spider" and "Sink the Welsh," a reference to the lyrics at the end of the song.

Awards

Personnel
Andrew VanWyngarden – vocals, guitar, drums, bass, synth flute
Ben Goldwasser – synth and samples, organ, piano, additional vocals
Matt Asti – guitar, bass
Will Berman – drums, guitar, bass
Jennifer Herrema – additional vocals

Charts

References

2010 singles
MGMT songs
2010 songs
Songs written by Andrew VanWyngarden
Columbia Records singles
Songs written by Benjamin Goldwasser
Music videos directed by Andreas Nilsson